Live in Berlin is a live album and video by German pop-punk band Jennifer Rostock, released on August 10, 2012. It was recorded at Stattbad Wedding in Berlin and includes songs from their first three studio albums: Ins Offene Messer, Der Film, and Mit Haut und Haar.

2012 live albums
Jennifer Rostock albums